William Dutoit (born 18 September 1988) is a French footballer who currently plays for Deinze in the Belgian First Division B.

Career
He scored a goal against K.S.C. Lokeren Oost-Vlaanderen in November 2015.

References

External links
 

1988 births
Living people
French footballers
French expatriate footballers
Sint-Truidense V.V. players
K.V. Oostende players
K.M.S.K. Deinze players
Belgian Pro League players
Challenger Pro League players
Expatriate footballers in Belgium
Association football goalkeepers